Iulian Bursuc (born 23 September 1976) is a retired Moldovan professional football player.

His son Andrei Bursuc is also a professional footballer.

External links
 
 
 

1976 births
Living people
Moldovan footballers
Association football midfielders
Moldova international footballers
Moldovan expatriate footballers
Expatriate footballers in Kazakhstan
Expatriate footballers in Lithuania
Expatriate footballers in Belarus
Expatriate footballers in Uzbekistan
FC Tiraspol players
FC Nistru Otaci players
FC Aktobe players
FK Žalgiris players
FC Savit Mogilev players
FK Tauras Tauragė players
FC Nasaf players
FC Dacia Chișinău players
FC Sfîntul Gheorghe players